Schönberg is a mountain of the Tegernsee Mountains in Bavaria, Germany.

Mountains of Bavaria
Mountains of the Alps